The 1974 American 500 was a NASCAR Winston Cup Series racing event that was held on October 20, 1974, at North Carolina Motor Speedway in Rockingham, North Carolina.

Joe Millikan would make his NASCAR Cup Series debut while Jerry Schild would exit the series in this event. A rare NASCAR Winston Cup appearance by former Champ Car team owner and driver Tony Bettenhausen Jr. would make this race into a landmark event in motorsports history. His first NASCAR appearance was at the 1973 Atlanta 500 while his final appearance at the Cup Series level would be at the 1982 Champion Spark Plug 400.

Background
North Carolina Motor Speedway was the project of Harold Brasington and Bill Land. Brasington, a land developer, also built NASCAR's first superspeedway, Darlington Speedway, in 1950. Land owned the property, which is settled in the sandhills of North Carolina, and together, they set out to find funding. They went to local lawyer Elsie Webb who assembled a group of backers. The duo also sold shares to the locals for $1 per share, and at one time had about 1,000 shareholders.

The speedway was built as a one-mile oval with flat turns. North Carolina Motor Speedway opened on October 31, 1965, holding its first race on the same day. The American 500 was a 500-lap, 500-mile NASCAR Grand National Series race won by Curtis Turner at an average speed of 101.942 miles per hour. Turner dominated the race, which was attended by 35,000 people, leading 239 laps and winning by 11 seconds. The winner's purse was $13,090. The American 500 was the 54th of 55 races in the 1965 season, which included NASCAR legends Cale Yarborough (who finished second), Richard Petty, Ned Jarrett (who would go on to win the championship), Buddy Baker, David Pearson, and Junior Johnson. Only 19 of the 43 cars were running at the end of the race.

The speedway held two Grand National races the next year, the Peach Blossom 500, and The American 500. The Peach Blossom 500 would change names multiple times, usually using the name Carolina 500, before ending as the Subway 400. The American 500 would also change names multiple times as well, ending as the Pop Secret Microwave Popcorn 400. The first race was typically held in early March or late February, and the second race was held in late October. In 1967 and 1968 the Carolina 500 was run in June.

Race report
There were 36 drivers who competed in this 492-lap racing event. All except for Canadian native Earl Ross were born and bred in the United States of America.

Joe Frasson's difficulties in handling his steering problems on lap 4 caused him to be credited with the last-place finish for this event. Elmo Langley became the lowest-finishing driver to finish the event; while J.D. McDuffie would be the last driver to achieve a DNF due to troubles with his stock car engine on lap 447. G.C. Spencer's vehicle suffered from an engine failure on lap 12 while Buddy Baker noticed that his car's brakes stopped working on lap 18. Transmission issues relegated Neil Castles to the sidelines on lap 21. Harry Jefferson's engine stopped working properly on lap 30 while Dick Brooks did terminal damage to his vehicle on lap 52. Engine failures would force Jody Ridley to leave the race on lap 85 and Dave Marcis to stop racing on lap 157.

A faulty vehicular water pump ended Ed Negre's day on lap 240 while terminal vehicle damage on lap 317 would end Richie Panch's race weekend. David Sisco noticed that his vehicle's suspension was giving him problems on lap 357; forcing him to accept a 26th-place finish.

The model years of the vehicles ranged from 1972 to 1974; with most of the field driving Chevrolet and Dodge vehicles.

After four hours and thirteen minutes of racing, David Pearson would defeat Cale Yarborough by slightly more than two seconds in front of an eager audience of 35,000 NASCAR followers. While Richard Petty, Buddy Baker and David Pearson would dominate the opening laps of this event, the final laps would become a "Cale Yarborough and David Pearson show."

Individual earnings for each driver ranged for the winner's share of $16,350 ($ when adjusted for inflation) to the last-place finisher's share of $550 ($ when adjusted for inflation). NASCAR officials permitted the handover of $99,465 for all the qualifying drivers of this racing event ($ when adjusted for inflation).

Only manual transmission vehicles were allowed to participate in this race; a policy that NASCAR has retained to the present day.

Qualifying

Top 10 finishers

References

American 500
American 500
NASCAR races at Rockingham Speedway